Exaerete dentata is a species of insect belonging to the family Apidae.

Synonym:
 Apis dentata Linnaeus, 1758 (= basionym)

References

Apidae